Columbia Rediviva (commonly known as Columbia) was a privately owned American ship under the command, first, of John Kendrick, and later Captain Robert Gray, best known for being the first American vessel to circumnavigate the globe, and her expedition to the Pacific Northwest for the maritime fur trade. "Rediviva" (Latin "revived") was added to her name upon a rebuilding in 1787. Since Columbia was privately owned, she did not carry the prefix designation "USS".

History

Early authorities claim the ship was built in 1773 by James Briggs at Hobart's Landing on North River, in Norwell, Massachusetts and named Columbia.
Later historians say she was built in Plymouth, Massachusetts  in 1787.
In 1790 she became the first American ship to circumnavigate the globe. During the first part of this voyage, she was accompanied by USS Lady Washington, named for Martha Washington, which served as tender for Columbia. In 1792, Captain Gray entered the Columbia River and named it after the ship. The river and its basin, in turn, lent its name to the surrounding region, and subsequently to the British colony and Canadian province located in part of this region.

The ship was decommissioned and salvaged in 1806. A replica of Lady Washington is homeported at Grays Harbor Historical Seaport in Aberdeen, Washington.

Officers
Simeon Woodruff, under the command of Kendrick, served as first mate from September to November 1787. A former gunner's mate during the final voyage of Captain James Cook, R.N., was the only man in the entire Columbia Expedition leaving Boston on the first voyage to have been to the Pacific.
Joseph Ingraham, first mate under the command of Kendrick.
Robert Haswell, first mate under the command of Gray in 1791–93 during the second voyage to the Pacific Northwest.
John Kendrick Jr, served as an officer under the command of his father, John Kendrick, during the first voyage. In 1789 at Nootka Sound left to join the Spanish Navy.

Legacy
 In 1958, a full-scale replica of the ship opened as an attraction, named "Sailing Ship Columbia", in Frontierland at Disneyland, and the three-masted vessel continues to ply the Rivers of America there most days of the year.  Contained within the hull is "Below Decks", which is an exhibit of nautical artifacts from the 18th Century that passengers can visit while on board. The ship was designed by Walt Disney Imagineering with direction from Admiral Joe Fowler and marine expert Ray Wallace.
 In July 1969, the name was used for the Apollo 11 Command Module Columbia, the mission which landed humans on the Moon for the first time.
 In 1981, the name was re-used for the Space Shuttle Columbia by NASA.

References

Further reading
 Log of the Columbia, 1790–1792. Proceedings of the Massachusetts Historical Society, Third Series, Vol. 53, (Oct., 1919 - Jun., 1920).
 Nokes, J. Richard (1991). Columbia's River. Washington State Historical Society. pp. 79–83. .

External links

Columbia Rediviva
 Hit and Run History: The Columbia Expedition

Ships built in Massachusetts
Age of Sail merchant ships of the United States
Pre-statehood history of Oregon
Fur trade
Exploration ships
Plymouth, Massachusetts
Expeditions from the United States
History of the United States
Pre-Confederation British Columbia
1773 ships